The Tunisia A' national football team, is the local national team that has represented Tunisia in football, since it played its first match on 30 March 2008 against Libya, which ended in a 1–1 draw.

It is a member team of FIFA and the Confederation of African Football (Continental) supervised by the Tunisian Football Federation, which was established on 29 March 1957, after Tunisia's independence from France on 20 March 1956.

The Tunisian national team is nicknamed the Carthage Eagles. The team's colors are red and white similar to the colors of the flag. Tunisia, and its symbol is the merciful punishment.

The Tunisian national football team is only open to Tunisian Ligue Professionnelle 1 players. The team won the African Nations Championship in the 2011 edition, which was held in Sudan. FIFA counts its matches as international A matches and does not distinguish the first team from the A' team.

History

Beginnings and first glories 
The beginning of 2011 saw tough political events in Tunisia. Under new coach Sami Trabelsi, the team played two home and away matches against Morocco victories 1–1 in the first leg at the Stade Olympique de Radès and 2–2 in the return leg at the Stade Mohammed V. thanks to goals from Saber Khalifa and Mehdi Meriah, thus qualifying for the first time for the African Nations Championship played in Sudan.After the group stage where she obtained a draw against Angola 1–1, a victory against Rwanda 3–1 and another victory against Senegal 2–0, she finds herself in the quarter–finals defending champions DR Congo 1–0 win. In the semi–finals, they face Algeria 1–1 and qualify on penalties. In the final,  Angola started off well piling feverish pressure on the Eagles of Carthage through the right flank but lacked a lot of polish with their finishing. Both teams raised the adrenalin levels of their fans with Tunisia coming close to scoring in the 13th minutes but the Palancas Negras man between the woodworks Lamá made a point blank save. Three minutes after, Zouheir Dhaouadi came close to scoring but the Angolan goalkeeper anticipated well to block it from his post.

Mejdi Traoui's powerful drive in the 20th minutes was punched aside by Lama who was well positioned to deny the Eagles their first goal. Adel Chedli sent the Carthage fans on their foot at the Al-Merrikh Stadium in the 37th minutes but he missed the post by an inch. Their one-two-one-two upfront kept mesmerizing the Angolan guardsmen but their finishing were poorly executed. The dingdong battle continued into the interval. The north Africans returned from the interval much determined. They set the stadium alive two minutes into the second half when Traoui Mejdi Traoui in the ball from waist level with a perfect right foot from Dhaouadi's cross from the left flank. Tunisia’s onslaughts began paying off from the 74th minute when Zouhaier doubled their lead with a fine left foot roll of the ball that went past Lamá straight into the woodwork. As the game wears on substitute Oussama Darragi put the final nail on the coffin in the 80th minutes to gift the north Africans the ultimate.

Tunisia participated in the qualifiers for the 2016 African Nations Championship in June 2015, in a group that includes Morocco and Libya. Tunisia played four home and away games under Henryk Kasperczak and qualified for the finals with one win, one draw and two losses. Hatem Missaoui leads the team in the group stage in Rwanda, with two draws against Guinea 2–2 and Nigeria 1–1 and a victory over Niger 5–0, the widest of the tournament history; Tunisia is however eliminated in the quarter–finals by Mali 1–2.

Constant absence 
In the next edition, the Tunisian Football Federation announced that Tunisia will not participate in the 2018 African Nations Championship due to the participation of the first team in the 2018 FIFA World Cup.

In 2020 African Nations Championship qualification, Tunisia faces Libya two home and away games, winning the first match 1–0 at Stade Olympique de Radès and the second 2–1 at Stade Boubker Ammar; Anice Badri scores the goals for Tunisia in both cases. The national team qualified for the final phase but, on 20 December 2019, the qualification was withdrawn by the Tunisian Football Federation due to the intensity of the matches.

Coaching staff

Managerial history

Players

Current squad
The following players were called up for the 2020 African Nations Championship qualification matches against Libya on 21 September and 20 October 2021.

Records

African Nations Championship record
Tunisia has participated in two editions of the African Nations Championship. In the 2009 edition, she is represented by the Olympic team, under the management of Mondher Kebaier. Tunisia is eliminated there in the qualification phase. In 2011, under the leadership of Sami Trabelsi, Tunisia qualified for the finals and won the championship by beating Angola in the final. In 2014, placed under the direction of Nabil Maâloul, she was eliminated in the qualification phase.

In the 2016 edition, under the leadership of Henryk Kasperczak, Tunisia qualified for the finals but it was Hatem Missaoui who led the team in Rwanda. Tunisia is eliminated in the quarterfinals by Mali. The Tunisian Football Federation announces that Tunisia is not participating in the 2018 edition.

Honours and awards

Honours 
African Nations Championship
  Champions: 2011

Awards 
African Nations Championship Top scorer

 2011: Zouheir Dhaouadi
 2011: Salema Gasdaoui
 2016: Ahmed Akaïchi

African Nations Championship Best player

 2011: Zouheir Dhaouadi

African Nations Championship Best Xl

 2016: Ahmed Akaïchi

Results

All-time results

Current team status

Results and fixtures

Records

All−time record
The list shown below shows the Tunisia national football team all−time international record against opposing nations.

As of 20 October 2019 after match against .
Key

Top goalscorers
 Ahmed Akaichi: 4 goals
 Saad Bguir: 4 goals
 Slama Kasdaoui: 3 goals
 Zouheir Dhaouadi: 3 goals
 Anice Badri: 3 goals
 Oussama Darragi: 2 goals

See also 
 Tunisia national football team
 Tunisia national under-23 football team
 Tunisia national under-20 football team
 Tunisia national under-17 football team
 Tunisia national under-15 football team

Notes

References

Tunisia national football team
Tunisia